Dylan Guthro (born 1991) is a Canadian singer/songwriter based in Halifax, Nova Scotia. The son of musician Bruce Guthro, Dylan released his debut album, All That's True, in 2012. In 2015, Guthro teamed up with fellow Halifax singer-songwriters Carleton Stone and Breagh Mackinnon to form the band Port Cities.

Life and career
Dylan Guthro was exposed to music since birth as the son of Cape Breton singer-songwriter Bruce Guthro. While on tour with his father, Guthro played some demos he had recorded of his own material to musician Dave Gunning. Gunning was eager to help transform the demos into a full-fledged album. What eventually became All That's True was recorded and mixed over a number of different sessions during the course of six months. Bruce Guthro co-wrote five of the album's songs, and it was not the first time they had collaborated; Dylan had co-written four on Bruce's previous release, No Final Destination.

All That's True (co-produced by Gunning and Bruce Guthro) was released in 2012. It was called "one of the strongest debut albums" of the year by a music critic in the Prince Edward Island Guardian, and won the Best New Artist Recording of the Year at the Nova Scotia Music Awards in 2012. The album also received a number of placements on the popular Canadian television series, Degrassi: The Next Generation. Guthro has toured extensively in Canada, as well as Europe.

Guthro's 2014 release, "Do It All Again," was written with singer-songwriter David Myles, and produced by rapper Classified. The song placed in the finals in the 2015 USA Songwriting Competition in the R&B Category.

Also in 2014, Guthro made his producing debut, when he co-produced singer-songwriter Dave Sampson's debut album, "No Pressure No Diamonds."

Guthro has co-written songs with artists of many different genres, and over the years became more and more involved in working with local hip-hop and EDM artists, resulting in three features on Quake Matthews’ latest album Rap Music. He also had several co-writing credits on Neon Dreams’ album The Last of Us including being featured alongside internationally renowned rapper Waka Flocka Flame on the single "High."

In 2015, Guthro and fellow singer-songwriters Carleton Stone and Breagh Mackinnon united to form the band Port Cities. The band makes singer-songwriter-style pop music featuring both two- and three-part harmonies. They originally met at the Gordie Sampson Songcamp in Cape Breton early in the summer of 2011, and have been playing together as a threesome for a few years before officially becoming a band. The band recorded their debut album in both Cape Breton and Nashville with producer/songwriter Gordie Sampson which was released in February 2017.

In July 2016, Guthro released a self-titled solo urban pop EP, which includes tracks co-written with his two Port Cities bandmates, as well as collaborations with Quake Matthews and members of Neon Dreams.

Discography

Albums

EPs

Singles

Producer credits

Songwriting credits (co-songwriter)

Awards and achievements
With Port Cities (band)

As Dylan Guthro

References

External links
 
 Video: "High" – Neon Dreams (featuring Waka Flocka Flame & Dylan Guthro)

1991 births
Living people
Canadian male singer-songwriters
Canadian folk singer-songwriters
Musicians from Halifax, Nova Scotia
21st-century Canadian male singers
Canadian folk rock musicians